The Boarding School: Las Cumbres is a Spanish mystery and teen drama-thriller television series, which premiered on Amazon Prime Video on 19 February 2021. Produced by Atresmedia Studios and Globomedia (The Mediapro Studio), it is a reboot of the popular series El internado, originally aired from 2007 to 2010.

Premise 
The fiction takes place in a boarding school for troubled teenagers located in an ancient monastery isolated from the world in which the students endure a strict disciplina. Four students, Manuel Villar, Amaia Torres, Paúl Uribe, and his sister Adele Uribe plot to run away from las Cumbres, a boarding school for "problem children". Adele backs out at the last minute and Paul cannot bring himself to leave his sister behind, so Amaia and Manuel run off into the woods. Manuel stumbles and is knocked out. Amaia watches in disbelief as a dark figure resembling a Plague Doctor picks him up and carries him away. When she is caught shortly afterwards by Mara the headmistress and Mario the gym teacher, they dismiss her claims as fantasy. Amaia and Paul, and later their friends, take it upon themselves to find out what happened to Manuel Villar. Their efforts lead to an ancient secret society, la Logia del Nido del Cuervo—The "Raven's Nest" (or "Crow's Nest") Lodge— and to other mysteries at Las Cumbres.

Cast 
 Key
 
 
 

 
 Carlos Alcaide as Manuel Villar
 Daniela Rubio as Adele Uribe
 
 Daniel Arias as Eric
  as Inés/Alicia
 Gonzalo Díez as Julio
 Paula del Río as Paz
Francisca Aronsson as Rita
 Natalia Dicenta as Mara, director of the boarding school
  as Mario, physical education teacher
 Mina El Hammani as Elvira, science teacher
  as León, music teacher
  as Elías, monk and Latin teacher
  as Arturo, the monastery abbot
 , Inés' father
}}
Introduced in season 2

Episodes

Series Overview

Season 1 (2021)

Season 2 (2022)

Production and release 
Created by Laura Belloso and Asier Andueza and produced by Atresmedia Studios and Globomedia, the series is a reboot of the series El internado, originally aired from 2007 to 2010, and of which Belloso and Andueza were respectively co-creator and screenwriter. Asier Andueza, Laura Belloso, Sara Belloso and Abraham Sastre were charged with writing the screenplay. Denis Rovira, Carles Torrens and Jesús Rodrigo directed the episodes. The rolling credits feature the theme "Corre" performed by Natalia Lacunza. Filming started in Navarre on 3 March 2020. Shooting locations included the Monastery of Irache in Navarre, San Sebastián, Hondarribia, Lazkao, Usurbil, Ergoien, Bilbao, Anglet and sets in the Zinealdea complex in Oiartzun. The first season consisted of 8 episodes with a running time of roughly 50 minutes. On 6 May 2021, cast additions for season 2 were announced. Directed by Denis Rovira and Mikel Rueda, shooting of the 8-episode season had already begun by then.

Reception 

Reviewing for  before the series' general release, Alicia P. Ferreirós highlighted among the things working well in the first season aspects such as the presentation in the pilot episode, the mythology building, the scare factor and the season finale, while she negatively assessed the late and irregular development of some plots other than the central one as well as the appearance of some expendable secondary characters. Likewise, Mariló Delgado of Hobby Consolas praised the mystery, the well-timed scares and the good performances by the cast members, while mentioning secondary plots having trouble getting started and apparently going nowhere as downside, giving it 84 out of 100. Álvaro Cueva of Milenio considered the series as "all the greatness of El Internado, the original, but with today's editorial and technical possibilities".

References 

Spanish-language Amazon Prime Video original programming
Spanish mystery television series
Spanish teen drama television series
Television shows filmed in Spain
Television series reboots
Spanish thriller television series
2021 Spanish television series debuts
2020s Spanish drama television series
Spanish horror fiction television series
2020s teen drama television series
2020s horror television series
2020s high school television series
Television series about teenagers
Television series by Globomedia